Erum Akhtar (born August 16, 1982 in Lahore, Pakistan) is a Pakistani actress. She is known for her roles in dramas Meray Mohsin, Kahan Ho Tum, Dil Mom Ka Diya, Adhoora Bandhan, Umeed, Aakhir Kab Tak and Mohabbat Daagh Ki Soorat.

Early life
Erum was born in 1982 on August 16th in Lahore, Pakistan. She completed her studies from Gulberg College with B.A.

Career
Erum started acting as a child actress on PTV in 1990s. She then worked in numerous drama serials, telefilms, sitcoms and advertisements throughout her career. She was noted for her roles in dramas Kabhi Aye Na Judai, Shikan, Yaad Piya Ki Aye, Barish Kay Ansoo, Jeevan Ki Rahon Mein and Kaghaz Kay Phool, Bint-e-Adam. She also appeared in dramas Adhoora Bandhan, Khushboo Ka Ghar, Kahan Ho Tum, Jithani and Maana Ka Gharana. She also appeared in telefilms. Since then she appeared in dramas Dil Mom Ka Diya, Umeed, Meray Mohsin, Aakhir Kab Tak and Mohabbat Daagh Ki Soorat.

Personal life
Erum is married and has two children. Her husband's name is Akhtar Bilgrami and the couple has two sons, Syed Wali Haider Zaidi and Taqi Haider Bilgrami.

Filmography

Television

Web series

Telefilm

Film

Awards and nominations

References

External links
 
 
 
 Erum Akhtar at Twitter 

1982 births
Living people
Pakistani television actresses
21st-century Pakistani actresses
Pakistani film actresses